Reinalod Kutscher Meier is an Uruguayan former Olympic rower. He represented his country in the men's single sculls at the 1976 Summer Olympics. His time was a 7:48.59 in the qualifiers.

References

Living people
1947 births
Olympic rowers of Uruguay
Rowers at the 1976 Summer Olympics
Uruguayan male rowers
20th-century Uruguayan people